Joana, Princess of Beira (18 September 1635 – 17 November 1653;) was a Portuguese infanta (princess), and the eldest surviving daughter of John IV, King of Portugal (the first of the House of Braganza) and his wife Luisa de Guzmán.

Life
Joana was born in Vila Viçosa on 18 September 1635. Her father created her Princess of Beira, a title subsequently used by the eldest daughter of the monarch.
She died unmarried in Lisbon at the age of 18 on 17 November 1653. She was first buried at the Jerónimos Monastery and then moved to the Monastery of São Vicente de Fora.

Ancestry

References

Sources

|-

1635 births
People from Vila Viçosa
1653 deaths
Princesses of Beira
Burials at the Monastery of São Vicente de Fora
House of Braganza
17th-century Portuguese people
17th-century Portuguese women
Daughters of kings